Kharghar is a node of Navi Mumbai and it is a suburb under Panvel Municipal Corporation. It is situated at the northernmost tip of Raigad district. It was developed by the City and Industrial Development Corporation (CIDCO).

Kharghar is now administered by recently established Panvel Municipal Corporation. Prashant Thakur, MLA represents Kharghar in the State Legislative Assembly as part of Panvel constituency. Kharghar is also developed as Education Hub of Navi Mumbai as many prominent schools and colleges are present in Kharghar Node.

Transportation

Navi Mumbai Metro
After years of delay, CIDCO recently issued a press release stating they were confident of kick-starting partial services of the Navi Mumbai Metro in December 2021.

In October 2021, the Navi Mumbai Metro received an Interim Speed Certificate by the Research Design and Standards Organisation (RDSO) based on successful trials on Line-1 connecting the Central Park metro station to the Pendhar metro station, which stretches 5.14 km between stations 7 and 11. The certification expedited the process of starting commercial runs from the end of December, 2021.

The Metro commencement was further delayed due to safety certification.

The railway board has approved coaches and other operational equipment, post a two-day inspection from the Commissioner of Metro Railway Safety (CMRS) on January 17–18.

The Navi Mumbai Metro is currently awaiting approval post a civil work inspection from CMRS, which will be the last clearance for rolling out its Line-1.

Navi Mumbai International Airport
The proposed new Navi Mumbai International Airport was initially expected to be operational by 2019 in the Kopra area between Khandeshwar and Kamothe. This was passed by CIDCO on August 1, 2009. Despite getting environmental clearance from the Centre almost three years ago, the project was stuck due to protracted negotiations with farmers who wanted a compensation package of Rs 20 crore per hectare or 35 per cent of the land bank as a developed plot.

The project, which will come up on 1,160 hectares of land, will be built in four phases. The first phase with an annual capacity of 10 million passengers was to be completed by 2018. After the completion of the whole project, it will cater to about 60 million passengers a year.

The affected villagers will mostly be rehabilitated in a new township called Pushpak Nagar and in Wadghar and Wahal villages around the project area. Under the project plan, the rare island village of Waghivali in Panvel creek will be converted into a mangrove lagoon and its ecology will be maintained.

Demography 
As per India Census 2011, the population of Kharghar was 80,612 out of these 42,001 was males and 38,611 was females.

Site for Central Park

The park occupies an area of 119 Ha. (approx.) spreading over into Sectors 23, 24 & 25 in Kharghar. An area of 80 ha. (approx.) is earmarked for ' Central Park'. It is a relatively flat terrain that has sporadic vegetation. The site acts as a link between two natural elements: hill and water.
Mumbai: A sprawling hill plateau spread over 250 acres at Kharghar in Navi Mumbai will soon be up for grabs. The
City and Industrial Development Corporation (Cidco) will hold a global auction with a reserve price of Rs 2,000 crore to
create a theme-cum-entertainment city on the lines of Hollywood, Disneyland and Sentosa park in Singapore.

Since its inauguration, the Central Park at Kharghar, is the center of recreational activities for people in Kharghar as well as other places. For safety there are four CCTVs at the Central Park, which will keep a check on the visitors and keep a track of all the people. This move aims at ensuring maximum security for those who visit the park," a senior Cidco official said.

Navi Mumbai Corporate Park
CIDCO has planned a better version of Bandra-Kurla Complex (BKC) in Kharghar with a layered structure with a pyramid-shaped central hub of high rises. The new structure will encompass an area of 200 hectares factoring in the central park and golf course. The actual corporate hub will be on 125 hectares of land. Cidco has decided to have a layered structure with the outer fringe to be developed with 1-2 FSI while the core area will have 3 FSI. Around 50% of the area (120 hectares) has been set aside for the high rises with 3 FSI for the pyramid-shaped structure. Plots will be auctioned for corporates with the richer entities vying for the hub of the corporate park. Shops and commercial properties will also be developed so that there is night life, unlike BKC. Proximity to the Navi Mumbai International Airport and the metro project worth Rs 13,000 crore, will provide high class infra, a spokesperson said. The entire Kharghar node along with nearby industrial and residential Taloja will get connected to the new airport lending an opportunity for businesses to hop between work stations and the airport.

The Lung Billboard at Kharghar

Kharghar has a pollution crisis of its own, arising out of the industries in the Taloja MIDC area, besides other sources, and residents have been facing health issues since a long time owing to the polluted air. The most impacted or polluted sectors in Kharghar are sectors 34, 35, 36 and 37, besides Taloja, Kalamboli and Panvel. Some local residents and activists have been monitoring the pollution and collecting data to be able to take action against polluting industries in the region.

On 15 January 2021, a city based environmental organisation, Waatavaran (Climate, Environment and Sustainability Foundation (WCES), set up an installation called the "Billboard the Breathes", at the Bank of India signal junction, sector 7, Kharghar. Though the installation was installed on 15 January 2021, it was inaugurated on Saturday, 16 January 2021, by Panvel City Municipal Corporation's (PCMC) Mayor, Dr Kavita Choutmol.

The billboard was installed to have a real time visual impact on the local residents of Kharghar and Taloja, who have been plagued by growing pollution emerging from the Taloja MIDC area, construction activities, the quarry at Kharghar and vehicular movement in the region. It was an remind local residents of the pollution crisis in the area every time they looked at it.

The installation, was the brainchild of Jhatka.org, and consisted two large-sized lungs depicting the human lungs, and retrofitted with HEPA filters and a fan to suck air, to mimic the process of human breathing. Along with that it had a digital air quality monitor to display the real-time air quality index (AQI). The lungs were white in colour by default and were meant to change colour as per existing pollution in the area during a stipulated period of time.

The local residents were encouraged to monitor the billboard on a regular basis to witness the impact of pollution on a day-to-day basis and it was to be monitored for two weeks to come to a conclusion.

However, the billboard had started changing colour from white to grey, barely a day after installation, alarming social activists, local residents and the administration.

The Air Quality Index (AQI) during the observation period was always between 230 and 365, which was very high, and continues to remain so. The experiment further fortified the earlier findings of another experiment by Waatavaran, which had revealed extremely high levels of PM2.5 in the air, in the Kharghar-Taloja-Panvel belt.

Education Institutes in Kharghar 

 ACPCE Management Studies And Research
 Annasaheb Chudaman Patil College Of Engineering
 Bharati Vidyapeeth Bharati Vidyapeeths
 Institute For Technology And Hotel Management (ITM)
 National Institute Of Fashion Technology (NIFT)
 Saraswati College Of Engineering
 Satyagrah College Of Arts, Science And Commerce
 Yeral Dental College And Hospital
 NMIMS, Navi Mumbai

References

Nodes of Navi Mumbai